Jiangsu University is a highly ranked and prestigious doctoral research university located in Zhenjiang, Jiangsu Province, People's Republic of China (PRC). It is a National Key University jointly developed by the Jiangsu Provincial Government, Chinese Ministry of Education, and The Ministry of Agriculture and Rural Affairs of the People's Republic of China.

History and overview 

Jiangsu University was established through the combination of Jiangsu University of Science and Technology, Zhenjiang Medical College and Zhenjiang Teachers’ College, under the permission of the Chinese Ministry of Education in August, 2001. Its main institution was the former Jiangsu University of Science and Technology, which was one of the 88 key universities designated by the State Council in 1978. Its history began with Sanjiang Normal School founded in 1902, which evolved and renamed Liangjiang Normal School in 1906, Nanjing Higher Normal School in 1915, National Southeastern University in 1921, Disi Zhongshan University in 1927, Jiangsu University in February and Central University in March 1928, and Nanjing University in 1949. Nanjing University Engineering College became Nanjing Polytechnic Institute in 1952 and then in 1960 a part of it became independent and moved to Zhenjiang next year and later became Jiangsu University of Science and Technology. It renamed Jiangsu University when merged with two colleges in the same city in 2001.

Jiangsu University (JSU) was founded in 1902 as a part of Sanjiang Normal University. It was retitled as Jiangsu University by integrating Jiangsu University of Science and Technology, Zhenjiang Medical College and Zhenjiang Teachers’ College with the approval of the Ministry of Education of China in August, 2001. The university’s undergraduate teaching was graded excellent by the Ministry of Education in 2004. It has developed to be a national comprehensive key university. According to the Evaluations of China’s Universities in 2017, 2016 and 2015 by China Academy of Management Science, JSU is ranked 41, 48 and 55, respectively. It is committed to cultivating talents with 4C (Confidence, Communication, Cooperation and Creation). Now the university is launching the new orientation of schooling for high-level, research-oriented university with strength of engineering and strategy of internationalization.

JSU offers 88 undergraduate programs, 170 master programs, and 42 PhD programs in 10 academic fields: Engineering, Science, Management, Economics, Medicine, Law, Education, Literature and History. The university has 13 post-doctoral research stations. Distinguished among its peers for its academic rigor, the 24 schools are competing and collaborating with each other for a high-level, research-oriented university with distinctive features and internationalization strategy.

JSU has 5,763 staff members (including those of Affiliated Hospital). 2,475 are faculty members, including 450 professors. 54% of them have got Ph.D degrees and over 24% have experience of overseas study. The current total enrollment of full-time students amounts to over 33,000, including 10,000 postgraduates, 842 international students from 74 countries. Jingjiang College of Jiangsu University has an enrollment of about 10,000 full-time students.

JSU has been promoting high-level research. In the recent 5 years, the total scientific research fund amounts to 25 billion RMB, sponsored by the governments and enterprises. The authorized patents in 2014 ranked 12  and in 2015 ranked 6  among China’s universities. Five disciplines have been ranked as top 1% in ESI, such as Engineering, Clinical Medicine, Materials Science, Chemistry, and Agriculture Science. Drawing on the big varieties of programs and multi-disciplinary strengths, we operate an array of research institutes and centers serving as both the academic think tanks and technological innovation source at the national and regional levels.

JSU gives priorities to the internationalization of the schooling, encouraging faculty members and students to go abroad for further studies, inviting more global talents to join us for mutual benefits, promoting international research collaboration as well as recruiting more overseas students.

JSU has signed institutional cooperation agreements with 87 universities in 30 countries and regions by June 2015. The Confucius Institute co-built by JSU and Graz University (Austria) has been operating smoothly since October 2010, followed by the opening of the collaborative Chinese-German Language and Culture Center.

Administration

Schools and departments
The university is organized into the following schools and departments.
School of Medicine
School of Medical Technology
School of Food and Biological Engineering
School of Business Administration
School of Mechanical Engineering
School of Material Science and Engineering
School of Finance and Economics
School of Electrical and Information Engineering
School of Environment
School of Computer Science and Telecommunication Engineering
School of Science
School of Humanities and Social Sciences
School of Foreign Languages
School of Art
School of Energy and Power Engineering
School of Automotive and Traffic Engineering
School of Chemistry and Chemical Engineering
School of Pharmacy
School of Law
School of Teacher's Education
Jingjiang College

Domestic academic collaboration in China

Jiangsu University maintains a large and extensive network of domestic academic and scientific collaboration with a large number of the universities in this official list of universities within the People's Republic of China (PRC) as well as with:
Macau University of Science and Technology,  People's Republic of China (PRC)

International academic collaboration
Cornell University, Weill Cornell School of Medicine,  United States of America
Oregon Health & Science University, School of Medicine,  United States of America
Purdue University,  United States of America
University of Rochester,  United States of America
Lawrence Berkeley National Laboratory,  United States of America
Northwestern Polytechnic University,  United States of America
University of Houston,  United States of America
University of Georgia,  United States of America
American University,  United States of America
Virginia Polytechnic Institute and State University (Virginia Tech),  United States of America
Washington State University,  United States of America
University of Maryland, College Park,  United States of America
University of Colorado,  United States of America
Texas A&M University,  United States of America
University of Texas at Austin,  United States of America
Texas Tech University,  United States of America
University of Illinois at Chicago,  United States of America
University of Illinois at Urbana–Champaign,  United States of America 
Wayne State University,  United States of America
California Polytechnic State University,  United States of America
California State University,  United States of America
University of Kansas,  United States of America
Kansas State University,  United States of America
Wake Forest University,  United States of America
University of Delaware,  United States of America
University of South Florida,  United States of America
Cleveland State University,  United States of America
University of Idaho,  United States of America
Oral Roberts University,   United States of America
Oregon State University,  United States of America
University of North Carolina,  United States of America
North Carolina State University,  United States of America
Arcadia University,  United States of America
Simmons College,  United States of America
Ohio State University,  United States of America
Indiana University,  United States of America
Indiana University-Purdue University Fort Wayne,  United States of America
Florida State University,  United States of America
Mississippi State University,  United States of America
Arcadia University,  United States of America
University of Cincinnati,  United States of America
University of Idaho,  United States of America
New England College of Optometry,  United States of America
National Academy of Engineering,  United States of America
Mississippi State University,  United States of America
National Taiwan University,  Taiwan
National Dong Hwa University,  Taiwan
National Tsing Hua University,  Taiwan
Chienkuo Technology University,  Taiwan
Dayeh University,  Taiwan
Taoyuan Innovation Institute of Technology,  Taiwan
National Kaohsiung First University of Science and Technology,  Taiwan
Chinese Culture University,  Taiwan
University of Zurich,  Switzerland
Université Laval,  Canada  
Université du Québec,  Canada  
Wilfrid Laurier University,  Canada  
York University,  Canada 
McGill University,   Canada 
Queen's University,  Canada
Royal Roads University,  Canada
Thompson Rivers University,  Canada
Centennial College of Applied Arts and Technology,  Canada
Saint Mary's University (Halifax),  Canada
McMaster University,  Canada 
University of Ottawa,  Canada 
Carleton University,  Canada
University of Waterloo,  Canada
Brock University,  Canada
Wilfrid Laurier University,  Canada
University of Prince Edward Island,  Canada
INRS-Institut Armand-Frappier,  Canada
University of Turku,  Finland
Turku PET Centre,  Finland
Norwegian University of Science and Technology,  Norway
Eindhoven University of Technology,  Netherlands
Wrocław University of Science and Technology,  Poland
University of Gdańsk,  Poland
University of Padova,  Italy
Université de Montpellier,  France 
Université de Reims Champagne-Ardenne,  France 
University of Sheffield,  United Kingdom
University of Chester,  United Kingdom
University of Nottingham,  United Kingdom 
University of Glasgow,  United Kingdom 
University of Manchester,  United Kingdom
Lancaster University,  United Kingdom
Loughborough University,  United Kingdom
University of Leicester,  United Kingdom
University of Leeds,  United Kingdom
University of Wolverhampton,  United Kingdom
Cranfield University,  United Kingdom
University of Northampton,  United Kingdom
Brunel University,  United Kingdom
University of Hertfordshire,  United Kingdom
University of Leeds,  United Kingdom
Edinburgh Napier University,  United Kingdom
University of Derby,  United Kingdom
RWTH Aachen University,  Germany
Karlsruhe Institute of Technology,  Germany
University of Duisburg-Essen,  Germany
University of Göttingen,  Germany
Technische Universität Ilmenau,  Germany
University of Applied Sciences, Worms,  Germany
Amberg-Weiden University of Applied Sciences,  Germany
Technical University of Kaiserslautern,  Germany
Konstanz University of Applied Sciences,  Germany
Worms University of Applied Sciences,  Germany
Otto-von-Guericke University Magdeburg,  Germany
Baden-Württemberg Cooperative State University,  Germany
Dalarna University College (Högskolan Dalarna),  Sweden
Kristianstad University College (Högskolan Kristianstad),  Sweden
Aarhus University,  Denmark
IBSS International Business School Styria,  Austria
University of Graz,  Austria
Graz University of Technology,  Austria
Hiroshima University,  Japan
The Kyoto College of Graduate Studies for Informatics,  Japan
Mie University,  Japan
NPO,  Japan
National Institute for Japanese Language and Linguistics,  Japan
Nagoya Sangyo University,  Japan
Tohoku University,  Japan
Yamaguchi University,  Japan
Osaka Prefecture University,  Japan
Kyushu Institute of Foreign Languages,  Japan
University of Shimane,  Japan
National University of Singapore,  Singapore
Singapore Polytechnic,  Singapore
Nanyang Technological University,  Singapore
Nanyang Creative Management,  Singapore
Jadavpur University,  India
Foundation of Liberal and Management Education (FLAME School of Business),  India
Kaziranga University,  India
Bogor Agricultural University,  Indonesia
Parahyangan Catholic University,  Indonesia
Changwon National University,  South Korea
Gyeongsang National University,  South Korea
Yeungnam University,  South Korea
Daebul University,  South Korea
Inha University,  South Korea 
Chungnam National University,  South Korea
University of Seoul, College of Engineering,  South Korea
Kunsan National University,  South Korea
Prince of Songkla University,  Thailand
Chiangrai Rajabhat University,  Thailand
Chiang Mai University,  Thailand
University of Education, Winneba,  Ghana
University of Cape Coast,  Ghana
Kwame Nkrumah University of Science and Technology,  Ghana
Koforidua Polytechnic,  Ghana
Kumasi Polytechnic,  Ghana
University of Education, Winneba,  Ghana
Accra Polytechnic,  Ghana
University of Sydney, Faculty of Pharmacy,  Australia
Griffith University,  Australia
Queensland University of Technology,  Australia
Khabarovsk State Academy of Economics and Law,  Russia
N.P.Ogarev Mordovia State University,  Russia
V.N.Karazin National University,  Ukraine
University of Khartoum,  Sudan
University of Malaya,  Malaysia
University Malaysia Sabah,  Malaysia
University Utara Malaysia,  Malaysia
University Malaysia Kelantan,  Malaysia
Shahjalal University of Science and Technology,  Bangladesh
University of Juba,  South Sudan
Upper Nile University,  South Sudan
University of Bahr El-Ghazal,  South Sudan
Rumbek University of Science and Technology,  South Sudan
Dr. John Garang Memorial University of Science and Technology,  South Sudan
Chalimbana University,  Zambia
Copperbelt University,  Zambia
Lewanika University,  Zambia
Mukuba University,  Zambia
Mulungushi University,  Zambia
Nkrumah University,  Zambia
Palabana University,  Zambia
Robert Kapasa Makasa University,  Zambia
University of Zambia,  Zambia
Kafrelsheikh University,  Egypt
University Of Sialkot,  Pakistan

References

External links

 
 Overseas Education College, Jiangsu University, official international website
 Suqian College 3rd dept. sponsored by 
 Jiangsu University Full Update by Educate Pulse

Medical schools in China
Universities and colleges in Jiangsu
Universities in China with English-medium medical schools